The 1939 All-Ireland Minor Hurling Championship was the 12th staging of the All-Ireland Minor Hurling Championship since its establishment by the Gaelic Athletic Association in 1928.

Cork entered the championship as the defending champions in search of a record-equalling third successive title.

On 3 September 1939 Cork won the championship following a 5-2 to 2-2 defeat of Kilkenny in the All-Ireland final. This was their third All-Ireland title in-a-row and their fourth title overall.

Results

All-Ireland Minor Hurling Championship

Semi-finals

Final

Championship statistics

Miscellaneous

 Cork's fourth All-Ireland Championship victory put them as joint record holders at the top of the roll of honour with Tipperary.

External links
 All-Ireland Minor Hurling Championship: Roll Of Honour

Minor
All-Ireland Minor Hurling Championship